Fabricia is a genus of polychaetes belonging to the family Fabriciidae.

The genus has almost cosmopolitan distribution.

Species:

Othonia bairdii 
Othonia johnstoni

References

Annelids